Hey Good Lookin' may refer to:
 "Hey, Good Lookin'" (song), a song by Hank Williams
 [[Hey Good Lookin' (film)|Hey Good Lookin''' (film)]], a film by Ralph Bakshi
 [[Hey Good Lookin' (soundtrack)|Hey Good Lookin' (soundtrack)]], the soundtrack to the film
Hey! Good Lookin' (album), a 1965 album by Bo Diddley
 "Hey, Good Lookin'", a Cole Porter song from Something for the Boys''